Malvern is an  inner-southern suburb of Adelaide in the City of Unley. It borders the suburbs of Unley and Parkside to the north, Highgate to the east, Kingswood to the south and Unley Park to the west. 

Many Malvern streets are planted with jacaranda trees, a non-native evergreen species, giving a shady aspect to the area in conjunction with the predominant architectural style of single-storey colonial villas.

Many of its streets are named after places in the United Kingdom, including Dover, Sheffield, and Cambridge.

Notable people

 Photographer Alfred Stump lived on Austral Terrace with his family, including his son, Claude Stump.
 Howard Walter Florey, Baron Florey who received the Nobel Prize in Physiology or Medicine in 1945 for his co-discovery of penicillin, was born in Malvern in 1898.

See also
 List of Adelaide suburbs

References

Suburbs of Adelaide